Kan-e Ahmadkhan (also Romanized as Kan-e Aḩmadkhān) is a village in Murmuri Rural District, Kalat District, Abdanan County, Ilam Province, Iran. At the 2006 census, its population was 34, in 7 families. The village is populated by Lurs.

References 

Populated places in Abdanan County
Luri settlements in Ilam Province